Kasganj district is a district of the Indian state Uttar Pradesh. It is located in the division of Aligarh and consists of Kasganj, Patiali and Sahawar tehsils. Its headquarters is at Kasganj.

History 
The district lies in the cultural region of Braj. Kasganj was established on 15 April 2008 by separating Kasganj, Patiali and Sahawar tehsils from Etah district. For a while, the district was named after a politician, Kanshi Ram. The decision taken by Mayawati, chief minister of Uttar Pradesh and president of the BSP provoked protests by lawyers who had proposed to call it in honor of Sant Sant Tulsidas, who was born in the district, that place known as Soron (Sukarkshetra). The district reverted to its original name in 2012. Adjacent districts of Kasganj are Aligarh, Budaun, Etah, Farrukhabad and Khair Tehsil.

Demographics

According to the 2011 census Kasganj district has a population of 1,436,719, roughly equal to the nation of Eswatini or the US state of Hawaii. This gives it a ranking of 345th in India (out of a total of 640). Its population growth rate over the decade 2001–2011 was 17.05%. Kanshiram Nagar has a sex ratio of 879 females for every 1000 males, and a literacy rate of 62.3%. Scheduled Castes make up 17.70% of the population.

At the time of the 2011 Census of India, 91.45% of the population in the district spoke Hindi and 8.27% Urdu as their first language. The local languages are Brajbhasha and Kannauji.

See also
Dholna

References

External links
Official Website
District Court of Kanshi Ram Nagar
Detailed district profile

 
Districts of Uttar Pradesh
2008 establishments in Uttar Pradesh